WEMT (channel 39) is a television station licensed to Greeneville, Tennessee, United States, serving as the Fox affiliate for the Tri-Cities area. It is owned by Cunningham Broadcasting, which maintains a local marketing agreement (LMA) with Sinclair Broadcast Group, owner of Bristol, Virginia–licensed dual NBC/CW affiliate WCYB-TV (channel 5), for the provision of certain services. However, Sinclair effectively owns WEMT as the majority of Cunningham's stock is owned by the family of deceased group founder Julian Smith. Both stations share studios on Lee Street on the Virginia side of Bristol (straddling the Virginia–Tennessee line), while WEMT's transmitter is located at Rye Patch Knob on Holston Mountain in the Cherokee National Forest.

History
This station has the historic distinction of having more owners (at eight) since it signed on-the-air than any other commercial television station in Tennessee. It began operations on November 8, 1985 as WETO, under the ownership of East Tennessee's Own, Inc. It was the first Independent in the area and aired an analog signal on UHF channel 39 from a transmitter on Viking Mountain's Camp Creek Bald on the Tennessee–North Carolina state line. The station first operated from studios located on Industrial Road in Greenville. Prior to WETO's sign-on, the channel allocation was occupied by a translator for ABC affiliate WKPT-TV. It had a general entertainment format consisting of cartoons, sitcoms, old movies, and religious programming.

On October 9, 1986, WETO became a Fox affiliate. East Tennessee's Own sold the station to MT Communications, a company named for and headed by Michael Thompson in 1989. On November 29, 1989, its call sign was changed to the current WEMT; the call letters were originally used by ABC affiliate WVII-TV in Bangor, Maine from 1965 to 1976. MT Communications had earlier purchased two other Tennessee stations, WCAY-TV (renamed WXMT, now WUXP-TV) in Nashville and WMKW-TV (renamed WLMT) in Memphis. All three MT stations were Fox affiliates; however, WXMT and WLMT subsequently lost their affiliations to competing stations in the respective markets under the terms of a deal between Fox and TVX Broadcast Group (those stations' former owner) stipulating any under-performing stations the company sold could lose the network affiliation. WEMT kept its Fox affiliation because it was not a TVX station, and in any event there were no viable choices for a replacement affiliate in the Tri-Cities.

MT Communications sold its three stations—WEMT, WLMT, and satellite station WMTU (now WJKT) in Jackson, Tennessee—to Television Marketing Group, a subsidiary of Chesapeake Bay Holding Company in 1992. Almost immediately, Television Marketing Group then sold the station to Max Television (later Max Media Properties) in 1993. Sinclair Broadcast Group acquired the Max Media stations in 1998. The Sinclair purchase partially reunited the station with WUXP, which had been sold separately in the early-1990s and by then was managed by Sinclair's WZTV. WEMT's digital signal on UHF channel 38 began operations in 2001. On February 8, 2006, Sinclair sold the station to Aurora Broadcasting, Inc. The station immediately entered into a local marketing agreement with WCYB.

In mid-December 2006 as a result of WCYB owner Bluestone Television's acquisition by the Bonten Media Group, Esteem Broadcasting bought WEMT from Aurora. Esteem would then pay $1.4 million in outstanding debt. WEMT then moved from its longtime studios on Hanover Road in Johnson City to WCYB's facilities in Bristol.

On January 13, 2009, it was announced WEMT would be dropped from DirecTV effective January 15 over a retransmission consent dispute. That same day, an agreement was made public and the station continued to be provided on the system. 

On December 15, 2009, WEMT obtained a Federal Communications Commission (FCC) construction permit to move its transmitter from Camp Creek Bald to Holston High Point in order to be co-located WCYB's tower, which was completed in late November 2011. According to the construction permit, Greeneville continues to be the station's city of license and secondary cities are Bristol (both TN and VA), Kingsport, and Johnson City.

On April 21, 2017, Sinclair announced its intent to purchase the Bonten stations for $240 million. As an aspect of the deal, the Esteem stations will be sold to Sinclair affiliate Cunningham Broadcasting, maintaining the current operational arrangement. The sale was completed September 1.

Programming
WEMT clears the entire Fox schedule, including its Xploration Station E/I block. Prior to picking up Xploration Station, WEMT purchased barter E/I programming, and the block was aired by ABC affiliate WJHL-DT2. Syndicated programming on WEMT includes Hot Bench, Entertainment Tonight and Inside Edition.

Newscasts
On September 12, 2005, WCYB began producing the area's second prime time newscast on WEMT from a secondary set at WCYB's studios. Known as Fox Tri-Cities 10 O'Clock News, it was originally seen every night for thirty minutes. This was expanded to an hour-long format on September 11, 2006. In October 2008, WEMT's newscast dropped WCYB's on-air look. Instead of using all blue graphics, this station now uses blue and red colors. The station also renamed the weather forecast segment and modified many other elements of the broadcast to distinguish itself from WCYB.

At some point in time, Paul Johnson (who was formerly sports director and weeknight sports anchor for both stations) began appearing on WEMT as a weeknight news and sports anchor and is now seen on both stations. His weeknight news co-anchor Rebecca Pepin is seen on WCYB also. On June 17, 2010, that station became the area's first to air local newscasts in high definition and the WEMT shows were included in the upgrade.

Technical information

Subchannels
The station's digital signal is multiplexed:

Analog-to-digital conversion
WEMT shut down its analog signal, over UHF channel 39, on June 12, 2009, the official date in which full-power television stations in the United States transitioned from analog to digital broadcasts under federal mandate. The station's digital signal remained on its pre-transition UHF channel 38. Through the use of PSIP, digital television receivers display the station's virtual channel as its former UHF analog channel 39.

Out-of-market cable carriage
In recent years, WEMT has been carried on cable in multiple areas outside of the Tri-Cities media market. That includes cable systems within the Knoxville market in Tennessee and Kentucky, the Lexington market in Kentucky, and the Asheville market in North Carolina.

References

External links

EMT
Fox network affiliates
Movies! affiliates
Charge! (TV network) affiliates
TBD (TV network) affiliates
Television channels and stations established in 1985
Sinclair Broadcast Group
1985 establishments in Tennessee